Zhelezin is a district of Pavlodar Region in northern Kazakhstan. The administrative center of the district is the selo of Zhelezinka. Population:   

Elmira Abdrazakova, born in the above Kazakh district, was crowned Miss Russia 2013, representing her adopted country at the Miss World and Miss Universe pageants that took place the same year.

References

Districts of Kazakhstan
Pavlodar Region